Richard Nixon, the 37th President of the United States, ran for president thrice:

 Richard Nixon 1960 presidential campaign, the failed campaign Richard Nixon conducted in 1960
 Richard Nixon 1968 presidential campaign, the successful election campaign Nixon conducted in 1968
 Richard Nixon 1972 presidential campaign, the successful reelection campaign Nixon conducted in 1972